Flower magazine is a bimonthly, seasonal publication based in Birmingham, Alabama. Founded by Margot Shaw in March 2007, the magazine features national and international content, including profiles of floral designers and their creations, stylish weddings, and inspirations for entertaining and decorating with flowers. Shaw is also the editor of the magazine. At the initial phase the magazine was published quarterly.

References

External links
 Flower magazine website

Bimonthly magazines published in the United States
Lifestyle magazines published in the United States
Quarterly magazines published in the United States
Magazines established in 2007
Magazines published in Alabama
Mass media in Birmingham, Alabama